Events in the year 1925 in Bulgaria.

Events
14 April – King Boris III of Bulgaria escapes an assassination attempt by armed anarchists while being driven through the Arabakonak Pass.
16 April – St Nedelya Church assault: A church in Sofia is damaged by an explosion set by Bulgarian Communists during the funeral of General Konstantin Georgiev. Two hundred people are killed.
30 August – The 1925 Bulgarian State Football Championship is won by SC Vladislav Varna.
19 October – Incident at Petrich: Near the Bulgarian town of Petrich on the border with Greece, a Greek soldier is shot. One theory is that a Greek soldier was running across the border after his dog, thus the incident is sometimes called "The War of the Stray Dog".

Births
15 January – Georgi Kaloyanchev, actor (died 2012)
3 April – Duke Ferdinand Eugen of Württemberg, first child of Princess Nadezhda of Bulgaria and her husband Duke Albrecht Eugen of Württemberg
10 April – Dobromir Tashkov, footballer (died 2017)

Deaths
16 April – Stefan Nerezov, military leader, 57 (killed in the St Nedelya Church assault)

References

 
1920s in Bulgaria
Years of the 20th century in Bulgaria
Bulgaria
Bulgaria